Éxito is a 2014 Korean-language EP by South Korean boy band Teen Top. The title song is "Missing", followed by release repackaged version of the album in the same year on November 10 "20's LOVE TWO ÉXITO", the title song was "I'm Sorry".

Tracks

Achievement list

Gaon Chart

Other songs accomplishments

Release history

References

2014 EPs
Korean-language EPs
Teen Top EPs